See-Saw is a Japanese pop duo (formerly a trio) originally from Tokyo, Japan. Its members included Chiaki Ishikawa (vocals) and Yuki Kajiura; former member  left the group in April 1994 to pursue a writing career.  The group temporarily disbanded in 1995, but reunited in 2001.

The duo of Ishikawa and Kajiura performed opening and ending themes in several anime series, including .hack//SIGN and .hack//Liminality, two insert songs for Noir, the first ending theme to Mobile Suit Gundam SEED, and the final ending theme to Mobile Suit Gundam SEED Destiny.

Discography
A list of See-Saw’s works can be found at vocalist Chiaki Ishikawa’s website.  Soundtracks and various artist albums that the group has also appeared on are listed here.

Albums
 I Have a Dream (September 26, 1993)
 See-Saw (October 26, 1994)
 Early Best (February 21, 2003) [compilation]
 Dream Field (February 21, 2003)
 See-Saw Complete Best "See-Saw-Scene" (June 10, 2020) [compilation]

Singles
 "Swimmer" (July 25, 1993)
  (September 23, 1993)
 "Chao Tokyo" (March 24, 1994)
  (August 1, 1994)
  (September 24, 1994)
  (February 1, 1995)
  (May 22, 2002) #45
  (July 24, 2002) #30
  (October 23, 2002) #5
  (January 22, 2003) #18
  (August 3, 2005) #4

Soundtracks
 Noir Original Soundtrack 2 (October 3, 2001)
  (November 7, 2001)
 .hack//SIGN Original Soundtrack 1 (July 24, 2002)
 .hack//Liminality Original Soundtrack (September 21, 2002)
 Mobile Suit Gundam SEED Original Soundtrack 1 (December 4, 2002)
 .hack//Legend of the Twilight Original Soundtrack (February 21, 2003)
 Mobile Suit Gundam SEED Original Soundtrack 3 (September 21, 2003)
 Mobile Suit Gundam SEED Complete Best (September 26, 2003 / January 15, 2004)
 Mobile Suit Gundam SEED Original Soundtrack 4 (December 16, 2004)
 Mobile Suit Gundam SEED Destiny Complete Best Dash (November 2, 2005 / May 7, 2006)
 Mobile Suit Gundam SEED Destiny Suit CD, Volume 9: Athrun Zala × ∞ Justice Gundam (January 25, 2006)
 Mobile Suit Gundam SEED Destiny Suit CD, Volume 10: Kira Yamato × Strike Freedom Gundam (April 21, 2006)

 Mobile Suite Gundam SEED Remastered Soundtrack See-saw. Re track  "あんなに一緒だったのに Anna ni Issho Datta no ni" "We Were So Close Together". this is going back to 2002 (February 22, 2012) 
Mobile Suite Gundam SEED Remastered Soundtrack See-saw feat Kalifina. Re track  "あんなに一緒だったのに Anna ni Issho Datta no ni" "We Were So Close Together". this is going back to 2002 (February 22, 2012)

Various artist compilations
 Girls’ Kitchen (December 1993)
 ILLUMINATED J’s SOUND I (February 2, 1994)
  (March 1994)
 Snow Kiss …Ing I (November 1994)
 Snow Kiss …Ing II (November 1994)
  (March 17, 1995)
 ILLUMINATED J’S SOUND II (March 25, 1995)
 Victor Anime Song Collection I (March 24, 2005)
 Victor Anime Song Collection II (March 24, 2005)

External links

English
 Chiakin.net (Unofficial fansite)

Japanese
 See-Saw at Victor Entertainment
 Yuki Kajiura at Victor Entertainment
 Chiaki Ishikawa at Victor Entertainment
 Yuki Kajiura's Official Website
 Chiaki Ishikawa's Official Website

References

Japanese pop music groups
Victor Entertainment artists
Musical groups from Tokyo
Anime musical groups
Yuki Kajiura